Hollywood Adventures is a 2015 action comedy film directed by Tim Kendall, starring Zhao Wei, Huang Xiaoming and Tong Dawei. It was largely filmed in Los Angeles, United States. The film was released on June 26, 2015.

Cast
Zhao Wei as Wei Wei
Huang Xiaoming as Xiaoming
Tong Dawei as Dawei
Sarah Yan Li as Zhang Yan
Sung Kang as Manny
Rhys Coiro as Gary Buesheimer
Simon Helberg as Harver Millsap
Missi Pyle as Casting Director
Omar Dorsey as Homeland Security Agent
Brian Thomas Smith as Dougie
Parvesh Cheena as Casting Assistant
Bridgett Riley as Mrs. Covington
Stephen Tobolowsky as Wronald Wright
Robert Patrick as Studio Guard
Rick Fox as himself
Kat Dennings as herself
James Patrick Stuart as Agent Fox
Roger Fan as Agent Li
Tyrese Gibson as himself (Cameo)
Hardy Awadjie as Movie Set Cop

Production

Reception

Critical reception
Derek Elley of Film Business Asia gave the film a 7 out of 10, calling it "a good-natured, tightly constructed action comedy".

References

External links

Films set in Los Angeles
Films shot in Los Angeles
2015 action comedy films
2010s Mandarin-language films
2010s English-language films
English-language Chinese films
English-language Hong Kong films
Films set in the United States
Chinese action comedy films
American action comedy films
Hong Kong action comedy films
Beijing Enlight Pictures films
2015 comedy films
Films scored by Nathan Barr
2010s American films
2010s Hong Kong films